According to the Book of Mormon, the Amlicites were a break-off group of Nephites in the Book of Alma, in 87 B.C.

Origins
After the murder of Gideon mentioned in the book of Alma and the execution of Nehor, the man who introduced priestcraft to the Nephites, there arose one after the order of Nehor whose name was Amlici.

According to Chapter two of the Book of Alma, he was very cunning and wise according to the wisdom of the world (verse one)  In verse two, he had gathered a great following of people.

His people endeavored to make him King over the Nephites. Now this was very alarming to the church and also to those who had not been persuaded by Amlici, because they knew according to the law that these things must be established by the voice of the people.  It was especially alarming to the church which had been established by Alma because they feared that Amlici would "deprive them of their rights and privileges..., for it was his intent to destroy the church of God". 
When the people assembled to cast their voices on the matter, the whole debate became contentious between the two camps. Further, the matter was laid before the judges of the land in the various assemblies of the people.

The voice of the people came back against Amlici and he was not made king over the Nephites.  Not content, Amlici stirred up his followers against those who were not in his favor.
He was consecrated king over his followers and he commanded that they take up their weapons of war against the Nephites to subject them to him. After this time his followers were known as Amlicites.

After the division
After the division took place among the Nephites, there unfolded a war between the Amlicites and the Nephites (Alma 2:11). The Nephites were aware of their intentions and prepared for war, building up arms and appointing captains, higher captains and chief captains (Alma 2:12-13).

Amlici prepared the Amlicites in much the same way, building up arms and appointing rulers and leaders of his people. The Amlicites distinguished themselves from the Nephites by marking themselves with red in their foreheads.

The Amlicites came up to the land of Zarahemla over the hill Amnihu which was east of the river Sidon and began to wage war.  Alma the younger was the chief commander of the Nephite forces. Though many Nephites died in the battle, the Nephites overcame them due to the strengthening of the Lord and drove them with a great slaughter and pursued for the rest of the day until Alma and his forces could no longer.  The Nephites broke camp in the valley of Gideon. (The man who was slain by Nehor.)

Afterwards, Alma sent Zeram, Amnor, Manti, and Limher to spy on the remnant of Amlicites so as to understand their plans.  To their surprise they reported to Alma that the Amlicites were joined in the land of Minon, above Zarahemla, in the course of the land of Nephi, by a huge host of Lamanites.  They were already making their way back towards Zarahelma. (Alma 2:21-25)

Alma and his armies then left the valley of Gideon and moved across the river Sidon.  They then were set upon by the hosts of Lamanites and Amlicites.  A great battle ensued and the Nephites with the aid of God drove them back.  Alma slew first Amlici and then drove back the king of the Lamanites and cleared the bank of the west side of Sidon and the joint army of Lamanites and Amlicites fled before the Nephites and went off into the wilderness (called Hermounts) out of the borders of Nephite Lands.

After the battle, the dead were buried but not numbered due to the greatness of the number that were slain. (Alma 3:1 also see Book of Mormon: Student Manual 121, chapter 22 section 13)

Other references
In chapter three, from verses four to eighteen, there is an explanation of how the Amlicites were now cursed with the Lamanites due to their marking themselves, just like God had set a mark upon the Lamanites.  The Book of Mormon: Student Manual 121 suggests in chapter 22 section 14 that this may have been done so that the Lamanites could know who was an Amlicite ally and a Nephite.

Some scholars, including Professor Royal Skousen, have proposed, based on spelling variations in the original manuscripts, that the "Amalekite" group appearing in the Book of Mormon is an alternative spelling of "Amlicite".  Thus, Skousen's research into the original manuscripts used as the source for printing the Book of Mormon clarifies that the "Amalekites" and the "Amlicites" are not two separate groups, rather are apparently one and the same group.  The original manuscripts provide evidence that this confusion arose due to human error in transcribing the Book of Mormon into English, as unfamiliar names were at times spelled inconsistently as the contents of the Book of Mormon were verbally dictated to the scribes.  This confusion, while not having doctrinal implications for the book's contents, still exists in the Book of Mormon as of this 2016 writing.

References

Book of Mormon peoples